The fashion industry is one of the largest polluters in the world, just after the oil industry. The environmental damage the fashion industry causes increases as the industry grows. Less than one percent of clothing is recycled to make new clothes and the production of green house gas emissions continues to increase everyday. The industry produces an estimated 10% of all greenhouse gas emissions. The production and distribution of the crops, fibers, and garments used in fashion all contribute to differing forms of environmental pollution, including water, air, and soil degradation. The textile industry is the second greatest polluter of local freshwater in the world, and is culpable for roughly one-fifth of all industrial water pollution. Some of the main factors that contribute to this industrial caused pollution are the vast overproduction of fashion items, the use of synthetic fibers, the agriculture pollution of fashion crops, and the proliferation of microfibers across global water sources.

Fast fashion 

Fast fashion is defined as "an approach to the design, creation, and marketing of clothing fashions that emphasizes making fashion trends quickly and cheaply available to consumers." The amount of new garments bought by Americans has tripled since the 1960s. Globalization has encouraged the rapid growth of the fast fashion industry. Global retail sales of apparel in 2019 reached 1.9 trillion U.S dollars, a new high – this number is expected to double to three trillion U.S. dollars by the year 2030. The world consumes more than 80 billion items of clothing annually.

Production and disposal of waste 
One concern with fast fashion is the clothes waste it produces. According to the Environmental Protection Agency, 15.1 million tons of textile clothing waste was produced in 2013 alone. In the United States, 64.5% of textile waste is discarded in landfills, 19.3% is incinerated with energy recovery, only 16.2% is recycled. When textile clothing ends up in landfills, chemicals on the clothes such as the dye can leech into the ground and cause environmental damage. When unsold clothing is burned, it releases CO2 into the atmosphere. According to a World Resources Institute report, the fashion industry releases 1.2 billion tons of CO2 into the atmosphere per year. In 2019, France announced that it was making an effort to prevent companies from this practice of burning unsold fashion items. Chile has long been a hub for unsold clothing, that was made in China or Bangladesh and passing through Europe, Asia or the United States before arriving in Chile, where clothing merchants then resell it around the continent.Clothing from all over the world arrive at the Iquique port in the Alto Hospicio free zone in northern Chile each year, an important center for trade in South America. What is not sold around South America or sent to other countries to be sold, stays in the Alto Hospicio free zone. If no one pays the necessary tariffs to take it away, it is then dumped in the Atacama Desert.

Synthetic fibers and natural fibers

Polyester 
Polyester was one of the most popular fibers used in fashion in 2017, found in about 60% of garments in retail stores and equalling about 21.3 million tons of polyester fiber. There was a 157% increase of polyester clothing consumption from 2000 to 2015. Synthetic polyester is made from a chemical reaction of coal, petroleum, air, and water, two of which are fossil fuels. When coal is burned it creates heavy amounts of air pollution containing carbon dioxide. When petroleum is usedit creates several air pollutants such as particulate matter, nitrogen oxides, carbon monoxide, hydrogen sulfide, and sulfur dioxide. The creation of polyester creates pollution, in addition to waste from the finished product at the end of its life cycle. Polyester is "non-biodegradable" meaning it can never be converted by bacteria to a state that will not damage the environment. Washing polyester clothing leads to shedding of microfiber plastics which enter water systems, including oceans.

Cotton 
Cotton is the most common crop in the world aside from food. Half of all textiles produced are made of the fiber. Cotton is a water-intensive crop, requiring 3644 cubic meters of water to grow one ton of fiber, or 347 gallons per pound. Growing cotton requires 25% of insecticides and 10-16% of pesticides of what is used globally every year. Half of the top pesticides used in growing cotton in the US are deemed likely to be carcinogenic by the United States Environmental Protection Agency. Cotton production degrades the quality of the soil, leading to exhausted fields and expansion into new areas. Expansion into new areas leads to the destruction of local habitats and the associated pollution affects biodiversity.

Animal fibers and textiles 
Animal-based fibers such as wool and leather were responsible for 14.5% of global greenhouse gas emissions in 2005. Cattle have digestive systems that use a process known as foregut fermentation, which creates the greenhouse gas methane as a byproduct. In addition to the CH4 released from the ruminants, CO2 and N2O are released into the atmosphere as byproducts of raising the animals. In total, 44% of emissions caused by livestock are from enteric fermentation, 41% comes from the feed needed to raise the livestock, 10% comes from manure, and 5% comes from energy consumption.

Energy use here is measured in megajoules needed to produce one kilogram of the given textile. Water use here is measured in liters of water needed to produce one kilogram of the given textile.

Marine Impact

Improperly disposing of clothing can harm the environment, especially through wastewater. Chemicals from decomposing clothing can leach into the air and into the ground, affecting both groundwater and surface water. Aside from plastic pollution, textiles also contributes significantly to marine pollution. Unlike plastic, textile pollution's impact on marine life occurs in its various supply chain processes. Pollutants like pesticides and clothing manufacturing chemicals cling to particles that accumulate in the waters ecosystem and consequently enter into human food chains.

Microfiber pollution 
Plastic and synthetic textile are both created from a chemical structure called polymer. The Merriam-Webster dictionary defines polymer as “a chemical compound or mixture of compounds formed by polymerization and consisting essentially of repeating structural units.” For plastic, the common polymer found is PET, polyethylene (PE), or polypropylene (PP), whereas for textile, the polymer found the most abundant in the collection of waste is polyester and nylon textiles.

Textiles shed microfibers at every stage of their life cycle, from production, to use, to end of life disposal. These fibers end up in the soil, air, lakes, and oceans. Microfiber pollution has existed as long as the textile industry has, but only recently has it come under public scrutiny. The Ocean Wise Conservation Association produced a study discussing the textile waste. For polyester, it stated that on average, humans shed around 20 to 800 mg micro polyester waste for every kg textile washed. A smaller amount for nylon is found; for every kg of fabrics washed, we shed around 11 to 63 mg nylon microfiber waste to the waters. Washing synthetic textiles releases microplastics and microfibers into the oceans. This type of waste is most commonly found from washing machine cycles, where fibers of clothes fall loose during the tumbling process. An individual domestic load of laundry can shed up to 700,000 microfibers.

The Association also released a study stating that on average, households in the United States and Canada produce around 135 grams of microfibers, which is equivalent to 22 kilotons of microfibers released to the wastewater annually. These wastewater will go through various waste water treatment plants, however, around 878 tons of those 22 kilotons were left untreated and hence, thrown into the ocean. For comparison, 878 tons of waste is equivalent to around 9 - 10 blue whales in the ocean. This is how much we pollute just from textile.

Textiles are the main source of microfibers in the environment. Thirty five percent of the microplastics that are found in marine ecosystems, such as shorelines, are from synthetic microfibers and nanofibers. Such microfibers affect marine life in that fish or other species in the marine ecosystems consume them, which end up in the intestine and harm the animals. Microfibers have been found in the digestive tracts of widely consumed fish and shellfish. These fish are then consumed by humans, which leads to the absorption of micro pollutants in the fish in a process called biomagnification. Predators of the affected marine individuals are also harmed, as they consume their prey who now contain the microfibers. The yearly shellfish consumption of microplastics was found to be 11,000 pieces, and microfibers were found in eighty three percent of fish caught in one lake in Brazil. Further, about two thirds of synthetic fibers from clothing production will be found in the ocean from 2015 to 2050. In one study, the food consumption rates decreased in crabs who were eating food with plastic microfibers, which further lead to the available energy for growth to also decrease.

Techniques to address the environmental impacts of the fashion industry include a marine algal bioabsorbent, which could be used for dye removal through rich algal surface chemistry through heteroatom containing functional groups. Many techniques or potential solutions are difficult in their implementation, for instance the accuracy of marine sediment techniques to detect microplastics is not sufficiently tested among different soil samples or sources.

Eutrophication 

Clothing often contains non-organic, excessively farmed cotton which is grown with chemicals that are known to cause eutrophication. Eutrophication is a process in which fresh water sources such as lakes and rivers become overly enriched with nutrients. This causes a dense growth of plant life that is harmful to the ecosystem, which can eventually kill all living things in the local ecosystem. Two of the main ingredients in pesticides are nitrates and phosphates. When the pesticides leak into stream systems surrounding the cropland, the nitrates and phosphates contribute to water eutrophication.

Water Use 
The fashion industry consumes a large amount of water to produce fabrics and manufacture garments every year. The global fashion industry uses 93 billion cubic meters of water per year, or 20 trillion gallons. This is four percent of all freshwater withdrawal globally. This amount is set to double by 2030 if it follows the current trend. According to the United Nations Environment Programme, the fashion industry is responsible for 20 percent of global wastewater. Manufacturing a single pair of Levi jeans, will on average, consume about 3,781 liters of water to make. On average, to produce one kilogram of textiles will require 200 liters of water.

Potential ways to reduce impact 
The consumer use phase in the life cycle of clothing and other textiles is a significant area of impact yet it is often overlooked. While there is minimal research into energy efficient washers and dryers as a method of reducing impact on the consumer side, wearing garments for 9 months longer could cut overall waste by 22% and water use by 33%. On the producer side, choosing to make garments in popular colors and designs that consumers are more likely to buy is both a financially and environmentally responsible choice. Designing clothing that is more likely to be purchased can reduce waste on the production side. In 2018 the fashion retailer H&M ended up with $4.3 billion of unsold merchandise.

See also
 Digital Product Passport
 Sustainable fashion
 Milkweed
 Stinging nettle

References

Further reading
 
 
 

Fashion industry
Pollution